Infascelli is an Italian surname. Notable people with the surname include: 

 Alex Infascelli (born 1967), Italian director, screenwriter and producer
 Carlo Infascelli (1913–1984), Italian film producer, director, screenwriter
 Fiorella Infascelli (born 1952), Italian film director and screenwriter

Italian-language surnames